The Rehabilitation Act of 1973 is a United States federal law, codified at  et seq. The principal sponsor of the bill was Rep. John Brademas (D-IN-3). The Rehabilitation Act of 1973 replaces preexisting laws (collectively referred to as the Vocational Rehabilitation Act) to extend and revise the authorization of grants to States for vocational rehabilitation services, with special emphasis on services to those with the most severe disabilities, to expand special Federal responsibilities and research and training programs with respect to individuals with disabilities, to establish special responsibilities in the Secretary of Health, Education, and Welfare for coordination of all programs with respect to individuals with disabilities within the Department of Health, Education, and Welfare, and for other purposes.

The Rehabilitation Act requires affirmative action in employment by the federal government and by government contractors and prohibits discrimination on the basis of disability in programs conducted by federal agencies, in programs receiving federal financial assistance, in federal employment, and in the employment practices of federal contractors. The standards for determining employment discrimination under the Rehabilitation Act are the same as those used in title I of the Americans with Disabilities Act.

President Richard Nixon signed  into law on September 26, 1973 after he had vetoed two previous versions.

Section 501
Section 501 requires affirmative action and nondiscrimination in employment by Federal agencies of the executive branch. To obtain more information or to file a complaint, employees must contact their agency's Equal Employment Opportunity Office.

Section 503
Section 503 requires affirmative action and prohibits employment discrimination by Federal government contractors and subcontractors with contracts of more than $10,000.

Section 504

Section 504 of the Rehabilitation Act created and extended civil rights to people with disabilities. Section 504 has also provided opportunities for children and adults with disabilities in education, employment and various other settings. It even allows for reasonable accommodations such as special study area and assistance as necessary for each student.

Section 505
Section 505 contains provisions governing remedies and attorney's fees under Section 501.

Section 508

Section 508 of the Rehabilitation Act establishes requirements for electronic and information technology developed, maintained, procured, or used by the Federal government. Section 508 requires Federal electronic and information technology to be accessible to people with disabilities, including employees and members of the public.

An accessible information technology system is one that can be operated in a variety of ways and does not rely on a single sense or ability of the user. For example, a system that provides output only in visual format may not be accessible to people with visual impairments, and a system that provides output only in audio format may not be accessible to people who are deaf or hard of hearing. Some individuals with disabilities may need accessibility-related software or peripheral devices in order to use systems that comply with Section 508.

Operational administration of the disability civil rights laws
Court cases occur because operational administration of the laws may be faulty in individual or related to classes (e.g., restaurant industry, sensory impairments), or there is disagreement about the law itself (e.g., definition of reasonable accommodation), in addition to other reasons (e.g., disagreement that citizens are entitled to civil rights). Experts in civil rights laws are involved in education of governments, Americans with disabilities, citizens, special interest groups (e.g., disability classes), non-profit and for-profit agencies, and community groups on the "application of these federal laws" in daily lives, including workplaces.

In the area of employment law, Syracuse University's Peter Blanck, currently Executive of the Burton Blatt Institute, has offered detailed advice on the implementation of central concepts of the employment-rehabilitation laws. While the Americans with Disabilities Act (ADA) of 1990 is the current base law, the Rehabilitation Act of 1973, amended in 1978 is also cited in these legal cases, including accommodations for individuals with intellectual and developmental disabilities. Hearings at the local levels often do not recognize experts in practice, and thus legal cases repeatedly must be appealed through the federal systems.

Personal assistance in the workplace has also been supported as a reasonable accommodation, a central concept in employment and disability law (Sections IV &4.8, 4.11; XI & 11.6, 11.8, 11.10; XVI & 16.7, 16.8). The American Association on Intellectual and Developmental Disabilities has indicated that supported employment is considered to be a workplace accommodation under the Americans with Disabilities Act of 1990 (Sections IV & 4.7, 4.11; XI & 11.6, 11.8, 11.10: XVI & 16.7,16.8).

Significant amendments
Significant amendments were made to the Rehabilitation Act in 1974. The most important was the expansion of the definition of "handicapped individual." The original 1973 Act defined a "handicapped individual" as

The 1974 amendments substituted a much broader definition of "handicapped individual" applicable to employment by the federal government (Section 501), modification or elimination of architectural and transportation barriers (Section 502), employment by federal contractors (section 503) and to programs receiving federal financial assistance (Section 504) that was not related to employability through vocational rehabilitation services. The 1974 amendments provided a handicapped individual meant

Congress adopted that definition in the Americans with Disabilities Act of 1990, substituting the term "disability" for "handicapped."

In 1986, Public Law 99-506 helped the Rehabilitation Act to refine and focus services offered to those with the most severe disabilities. Supported employment was also defined as a "legitimate rehabilitation outcome".

Title four of the Workforce Investment Act of 1998 amended the Rehabilitation Act in order to work with the WIA to accomplish the goal of helping people return to the workforce. Title four created a national council on disability, appointed by the president, to link rehabilitation programs to state and local workforce development systems. However, the Workforce Investment Act was repealed and replaced by the 2014 Workforce Innovation and Opportunity Act.

See also

List of court cases
Coleman v. Schwarzenegger
Plata v. Schwarzenegger
School Bd. of Nassau County v. Arline, 480 U.S. 273 (1987)

Related laws
 Adoption Assistance and Child Welfare Act, 1980
 Americans with Disabilities Act of 1990
 ADA Amendments Act of 2008
 Civil Rights Act of 1964
 The Developmental Disabilities Assistance and Bill of Rights Act of 2000
 Education for All Handicapped Children Act
 Individuals with Disabilities Education Act
 Individuals with Disabilities Education Improvement Act
 Family Educational Rights and Privacy Act
 Family Support Law of New York, 
 Health and Human Services Policies for the Protection of Research Subjects, 2005
 Maternal and Child Health Act of 1935, Amended 2013
 Social Security Act of 1935
 Title XIX of the Social Security Act
 Technology-Related Assistance Act for Persons with Disabilities
 Ticket to Work
 Ticket-to-Work Incentives Improvement Act of 1999
 Vocational Rehabilitation Act of 1974

Related organizations
 American Association on Intellectual and Developmental Disabilities
 Beach Center on Families, University of Kansas
 Consortium of Citizens with Disabilities-US
 World Institute on Disability

References

Sources
 
 OCR Senior Staff Memoranda, "Guidance on the Application of Section 504 to Noneducational Programs of Recipients of Federal Financial Assistance," January 3, 1990.
 Lynch, William, "The Application of Title III of the Americans with Disabilities Act to the Internet: Proper E-Planning Prevents Poor E-Performance," 12 CommLaw Conspectus: Journal of Communications Law and Policy 245 (2004).

Further reading
 
 

Special education in the United States
United States federal civil rights legislation
United States federal disability legislation
Anti-discrimination law in the United States
1973 in American law
93rd United States Congress